Cybook Gen3 is a 6-inch (15.2 cm) e-reader for reading e-books and periodicals, and it can be used to listen to MP3 and audiobook files. It was produced by the French company Bookeen.

Description
The Cybook Gen3 is a reading device based on E Ink screen technology. Its screen possesses a paper-like high contrast appearance and is readable under direct sunlight. The device offers a battery lifetime of 8,000 page flips. The Cybook Gen3 reads many file formats and offers access to a wide range of digital documents.  A Secure Digital card slot allows for expanded storage. To a host computer the Cybook Gen3 functions as a typical USB mass storage device, which allows for copying books from a computer. For this reason it is supported on all major operating systems, including Linux.

The device uses TrueType fonts (.ttf), and can also be used as an image viewer to display JPEG, GIF and PNG files, as well as to play MP3 files. The Cybook Gen3 supports PDF files, however it doesn't reflow text and early firmware did not allow zooming in on documents.  Current firmware revisions support ten levels of zoom and allow scrolling around the page, making the device suitable for reading many PDF files.  However, very large PDF files take a long time to display once the file is selected.  Some PDF files also cause the firmware to crash, which requires a hard reset by pressing the small button on the back side. 

The Cybook Gen3 runs Linux as its underlying operating system. While the firmware source code is mostly open-source, the Mobipocket reader application which allows the display of DRM-protected content is closed-source.

See also
 Comparison of e-book readers
 Comparison of tablet computers
 Cybook Opus - A newer product from Bookeen

References

External links
 Official website
 Bookeen Cybook Gen3 dedicated forum
 MobileRead Wiki entry
 The Future of Things comprehensive review of the Cybook Gen3

Dedicated ebook devices

de:Cybook Gen3